Edward Kenneth Taubensee (born October 31, 1968) is a former Major League Baseball catcher. Taubensee played for three different ballclubs during his career: the Cleveland Indians, Houston Astros (-), and Cincinnati Reds (-).

He made his major league debut on May 18, 1991, with the Indians, and played his final game on October 7, 2001. He is known primarily for being the player received by the Astros from the Indians in exchange for outfielder Kenny Lofton, a trade that many consider to be one of the most lopsided moves made in the 1990s, as Lofton went on to have an excellent career, while Taubensee played less than three full seasons with the Astros before he was traded to the Reds.  
Taubensee had a solid season in 1995 with the Reds, and he had the last postseason hit (an NLCS 8th inning single vs. the Braves) the Reds would have until 2010. Taubensee's best season came in 1999 as a member of Cincinnati Reds, when he surprisingly became one of club's best hitters for a team which was a surprise contender and nearly made the playoffs (ultimately losing an extra regular season game to go to the wildcard game to the New York Mets).

In 2017, Taubensee was named the hitting coach of the Augusta Greenjackets, a Class A affiliate of the San Francisco Giants in the South Atlantic League.

References

External links
, or Venezuelan Winter League

1968 births
Living people
Akron Aeros players
Baseball players from Texas
Buffalo Bisons (minor league) players
Cedar Rapids Reds players
Chattanooga Lookouts players
Cincinnati Reds players
Cleveland Indians players
Colorado Springs Sky Sox players
Greensboro Hornets players
Gulf Coast Reds players
Houston Astros players
Major League Baseball catchers
Navegantes del Magallanes players
American expatriate baseball players in Venezuela
People from Beeville, Texas
Tucson Toros players
Minor league baseball coaches